Germán Mesa Fresneda (born May 12, 1967 in Havana) is a Cuban retired shortstop who played for the Industriales of the Cuban National Series and for the Cuban national baseball team. Mesa was known as "El Imán" or "The Magnet" for his superior fielding skills. He was also an above average hitter and base runner who led Cuban baseball in hits, triples, and stolen bases during his career. German retired in 2002, and is now a trainer for the national team.

In October 1996, Mesa was banned from Cuban baseball, for allegedly taking money from an American sports agent. His suspension was lifted in March 1998.

In Olympic competition, he won a gold medal in 1992 and a silver in 2000. He is a former manager of Industriales.

References

External links
 

Banned Cuban baseball players
1967 births
Living people
Olympic baseball players of Cuba
Olympic gold medalists for Cuba
Olympic silver medalists for Cuba
Olympic medalists in baseball
Medalists at the 1992 Summer Olympics
Medalists at the 2000 Summer Olympics
Baseball players at the 1992 Summer Olympics
Baseball players at the 2000 Summer Olympics
Pan American Games gold medalists for Cuba
Baseball players at the 1991 Pan American Games
Baseball players at the 1995 Pan American Games
Baseball players at the 1999 Pan American Games
Baseball players from Havana
Pan American Games medalists in baseball
Goodwill Games medalists in baseball
Competitors at the 1990 Goodwill Games
Medalists at the 1991 Pan American Games
Medalists at the 1995 Pan American Games
Medalists at the 1999 Pan American Games